Calaveras Lake can refer to the following bodies of water:

 Calaveras Reservoir (California)
 Calaveras Lake (Texas)